The 2021–22 season is Bangkok United Football Club's 13th in the new era since they took over from Bangkok University Football Club in 2009. It is the 6th season in the Thai League and the club's 11th (8th consecutive) season in the top flight of the Thai football league system since returning in the 2013 season.

In the league, the season was supposed to start on 31 July 2021 and concluded on 21 May 2022.  Then, due to the situation of the COVID-19 pandemic is still severe, FA Thailand decided to postpone the season to start on 13 August 2021 instead. However, as it stands on 23 July 2021, the COVID-19's situation is getting even worse. Therefore, FA Thailand decided to postpone the opening day for the second time to start on 3 September 2021.

Squad

Transfer

Pre-season transfer

In

Out

Return from loan

Mid-season transfer

In

Out

Return from loan

Friendlies

Pre-Season Friendly

Mid-Season Friendly

Competitions

Overview

Thai League

League table

Results overview

Matches

FA Cup

League Cup

Statistics

Appearances and goals

|-
! colspan="16" style="background:#DCDCDC; text-align:center;"| Goalkeepers

|-
! colspan="16" style="background:#DCDCDC; text-align:center;"| Defenders

|-
! colspan="16" style="background:#DCDCDC; text-align:center;"| Midfielders

|-
! colspan="16" style="background:#DCDCDC; text-align:center;"| Forwards

|-
! colspan="16" style="background:#dcdcdc; text-align:center"| Players transferred/loaned out during the season

Notes

References

BKU
Bangkok United F.C. seasons
Thai football clubs 2022 season